Platylesches rossii, the Loma hopper, is a butterfly in the family Hesperiidae. It is found in Senegal, Guinea, Sierra Leone, Ivory Coast and Ghana. The habitat probably consists of the forest/savanna transition zone.

Adult males mud-puddle.

References

Butterflies described in 1986
Erionotini